Kammathep Sorn Kol (  lit. "Tricky Love") is a Thai lakorn, the sixth drama in the series The Cupids, based on a novel series of the same name. It was aired on every Friday–Sunday from June 3, until June 17, 2017.

Synopsis
Milin (Nuttanicha Dungwattanawanich), work in the financial department of "Cupid Hut" company. She meets Saran (Phakin Khamwilaisak), a dentist at the "Cupid Hut" company with his friend, Thankrit (Ron Pattharapon ToOun). Saran doesn't believe in love, he only came because Thankrit, a friend from high school ask him to. At the company, the three meet Rarin (Pitchapa Phanthumchinda), Milin classmate from high school. Thankrit took an interest in Rarin right away, but Rarin only have her eyes on Saran. Will Milin be able to complete this task?

Cast

Main
Nuttanicha Dungwattanawanich as Mim/Milin
Phakin Khamwilaisak as Saran

Supporting
Ron Pattharapon ToOun as Tanakrit
Pitchapa Phanthumchinda as Rarin
 as Lieutenant Pratchawin
 as Orn
 as Sarut (Saran's dad)
 as Milin's grandfather
Surasak Chaiat as Rarin's father
 as Motdaeng

Guest
Theeradej Wongpuapan as Peem
Araya A. Hargate as Waralee
Jarinporn Joonkiat as Hunsa
Thikamporn Ritta-apinan as Oil / Nantisa
Kannarun Wongkajornklai as Prima
 as Angie
Mintita Wattanakul as Cindy
 as Ben
 as Man / Minnie
Oak Keerati

Original Soundtrack

References

External links 
 Ch3 Thailand Official Website
 Ch3 Thailand Official YouTube

2010s Thai television series
Thai drama television series
2017 Thai television series debuts
2017 Thai television series endings
Thai romance television series
Thai television soap operas
Channel 3 (Thailand) original programming
Television series by Broadcast Thai Television